The 2014 FC Kaisar season was the 1st season back in the Kazakhstan Premier League, the highest tier of association football in Kazakhstan, following their demotion to the Kazakhstan First Division in 2012. Kaisar finished the season in 5th place, narrowly missing out on a UEFA Europa League place on goal difference. Kaisar also reached the Second Round of the Kazakhstan Cup where they were knocked out by Aktobe.

Squad

Transfers

Winter

In:

Out:

Summer

In:

Out:

Competitions

Kazakhstan Premier League

First round

Results

League table

Championship Round

Results summary

Results by round

Results

Table

Kazakhstan Cup

Squad statistics

Appearances and goals

|-
|colspan="14"|Players who appeared for Kaisar that left during the season:

|}

Goal scorers

Disciplinary record

References

Kaisar
FC Kaisar seasons